Kinect Nat Geo TV is an interactive television program for the Xbox 360 video game console. It was developed by Relentless Software and SkyBox Labs, and published by Microsoft Studios. It was released on 18 September 2012.

The game comprises eight 30-minute, Nat Geo TV programs that allow the user to interact in activities related to the contents of the TV program.

References

2012 video games
Kinect games
Microsoft games
Video games developed in the United Kingdom
Xbox 360 games
Xbox 360-only games
Video games using Havok
Relentless Software games
SkyBox Labs games